Hernando de los Ríos Coronel (1559–1621?) was a mathematician, cosmographer, cartographer, navigator, naval pilot, administrator, soldier, priest, and advocate (Procurator General) at the Spanish court of the inhabitants of The Philippines (from 1606 to 1610 and again from 1618 until his death.

Having attained the rank of military captain, he accompanied governor Luis Pérez Dasmariñas on his expedition to Luzon and Cambodia and spent time in China in 1597. There he prepared the first map of Luzon, Taiwan (also known as Formosa or Isla Hermosa) and certain areas of the Chinese coast.

As navigator 

De los Ríos Coronel combined his expertise as navigator with those of an experimenter. This was common practice and part of developments in science at that time, which had received renewed impulse with the founding of the Spanish Royal Academy of Sciences in Madrid.  Said scientific developments aimed to update instruments and tables for navigation based on astronomical observation, combined with an attempt to determine the geographical longitude at sea.

Two concrete examples where he combined his expertise as a navigator with those of an experimenter, are the development of a type of still enabling the extraction of sweetwater from seawater while at sea, for which he requested a license. and testing a new type of sea compass invented by Fonseca

Also, as a navigator De los Ríos advocated reform of the way particularly Asian crew during transpacific voyages were treated. He recommended providing them with adequate food, clothing and protection against the elements. Lee notes that the harsh working conditions of Asian mariners, coupled with the long and perilous journey, made many of them decide to stay on in the Americas, thus forming part of a wider migration of Asians to the Americas and New Spain.

As cosmographer and mapmaker 
Orginally cosmography had the meaning of protoscience of mapping the general features of the cosmos, heaven and Earth, thus a cosmographer combined map making (i.e. cartographer) with scientific experiments aimed to update instruments and tables for a wide range of applications. In De los Rios Coronel's case this had mainly to do with navigation based on astronomical observation and mathematics, specifically with the Philippines and Taiwan.

Reasons for making the map of Taiwan 
Andrade argues that De los Ríos Coronel viewed Taiwan as being part of the Philippine archipelago and a possession of the Crown of Castile.

With a distance of only 700 kilometers north of the island of Luzon, which formed the heart of the Spanish colony of the Philippines, Spanish officials argued for the defense of Taiwan against the Dutch (which had established a colony in the south of Taiwan). Together with these officials, De los Ríos Coronel feared Taiwan might soon be lost and the Philippines being threathened next.

Furthermore, he pointed out that Taiwan possesed a good harbor at Jilong, modern-day Port of Keelung which could be easily defended; "With three-hundred men and a fortress placed there, all the powers of these parts would not be enough to dislodge them, for the entrance is narrow and easy to defend with artillery. The port is large, deep, and safe from winds."

Map of Taiwan (Isla Hermosa) 

According to Lamb, in 1597 De los Ríos Coronel drew the first map of map of the islands of Taiwán (Hermosa o Formosa), Luzón and Chinese coast. The map is oriented north to south and west to east respectively. It depicts the main island of Luzon (currently part of Philippines) on the bottom of the map, including Manila and Manila Bay and Cagayan, spelled as cagaian on the map.

At the top of the map the island of Taiwan is depicted. De los Ríos Coronel denotes the island as 'Isla Hermosa', literally meaning 'beautiful island' in Spanish. On the top right corner of the island De los Ríos Coronel jotted down the location of the Port of Keelung (Puerto de Keilang).

In the top right corner part of the current Ryukyu Islands are depicted, which are named Lequios in the map, while De los Ríos Coronel writes that islands are on the way to Japan, 'por aqui sera a Japon'.

The top left corner of the map depicts the locations of Canton, modern Guangzhou and Macau.

References

16th-century cartographers